Area code 228 is the telephone area code in the North American Numbering Plan (NANP) for the Gulf Coast in the U.S. state of Mississippi, serving the three counties in the state's southeastern tip: Hancock, Harrison, and Jackson. It was the second area code created in the state, when in 1997, the numbering plan area was split from the original, state-wide area code 601. Area code 601 was further reduced in size when area code 662 was created in 1999 for the northern half of Mississippi.

Exhaustion analysis of this small numbering plan area shows that exhaustion is unlikely for the foreseeable future.

Service area
Area code 228 serves the following cities:

Bay St. Louis
Biloxi
D'Iberville
Diamondhead
Gautier
Gulfport
Long Beach
Moss Point
Ocean Springs
Pascagoula
Pass Christian
Vancleave
Waveland

See also
List of Mississippi area codes

References

External links

Telecommunications-related introductions in 1997
228
228
1997 establishments in Mississippi